Shah Baghi may refer to:
 Shah Baghi, East Azerbaijan
 Shah Baghi, Markazi